Polytoca is a genus of Asian and Papuasian plants in the grass family.

 Species
 Polytoca digitata (L.f.) Druce - southern China, eastern Himalayas, Andaman Islands, Indochina, Philippines, Java, New Guinea
 Polytoca wallichiana (Nees ex Steud.) Benth. - eastern Himalayas, Andaman & Nicobar Islands, Thailand, Myanmar, Vietnam

 formerly included
see Chionachne Cleistochloa Trilobachne

References

Poaceae genera
Andropogoneae